Jaime de Piniés (18 November 1917 – 29 December 2003) was a Spanish diplomat who served for one year as the President of the United Nations General Assembly. Before he held that position he served as Spain's Permanent Representative to the United Nations for approximately fourteen non-consecutive years. The first time being from September 1968 to May 1972 and the second lasted from September 1973 until June 1985. He had a law degree from the University of Madrid.

References

Presidents of the United Nations General Assembly
Permanent Representatives of Spain to the United Nations
People from Madrid
1917 births
2003 deaths
Complutense University of Madrid alumni